CBI may refer to:

Companies and groups 
 California Bureau of Investigation, a state police force in USA
 Center for the Promotion of Imports (Dutch: Centrum tot Bevordering van de Import uit ontwikkelingslanden, CBI), an agency of the Netherlands Ministry of Foreign Affairs
 Central Bank of Iceland
 Central Bank of India
 Central Bank of Iran
 Central Bank of Iraq
 Central Bank of Ireland
 Central Bureau of Investigation, a federal agency of India
 Charles Babbage Institute, a research center at the University of Minnesota
 Chicago Bridge & Iron Company, a large engineering and construction company
 Commonwealth Builders, Inc., forerunner established in 1934 of the Washington Commonwealth Federation
 Colorado Bureau of Investigation, a state police force
 Confederation of British Industry, an organisation promoting United Kingdom businesses

Places and installations 

 Center for Biomedical Imaging, a research facility of Boston University Medical Center
 Central Bukidnon Institute, a secondary school in the Philippines
 China Burma India Theater, a theater of World War II
 Community Boating, Inc, a non-profit community boating center on the Charles River in Boston, Massachusetts
 Cosmic Background Imager, a radio telescope in the Chilean Andes

Radio 

 CBI (AM), radio station broadcast in Canada
 CBI-FM, radio station broadcast in Canada

Other 
 Caribbean Basin Initiative, a United States economic recovery program
 CBI (film series), a series of Malayalam films
 Central bank#Independence, monetary theory 
 Citizenship by investment, a type of immigrant investor program
 College Basketball Invitational, an American college basketball tournament 
 College Bowl, an American televised quiz tournament
 Computer-based interlocking, a type of railway signal interlocking
 Content-based instruction, a method of teaching a second-language teaching.
 Challenge-based instruction, an alternate term for challenge-based instruction
Congenital disorder, a form of brain injury
 Continuous bladder irrigation, see List of medical abbreviations: C